Prince Lü of the First Rank, or simply Prince Lü, was the title of a princely peerage used in China during the Manchu-led Qing dynasty (1636–1912). As the Prince Lü peerage was not awarded "iron-cap" status, this meant that each successive bearer of the title would normally start off with a title downgraded by one rank vis-à-vis that held by his predecessor. However, the title would generally not be downgraded to any lower than a feng'en fuguo gong except under special circumstances.

The first bearer of the title was Yuntao (1686–1763), the 12th son of the Kangxi Emperor. In 1722, Yuntao was made a junwang (second-rank prince) by his father for his military achievements. However, a year later, he was demoted two grades to beizi, but was restored as a junwang in 1730. In 1735, he was promoted to qinwang (first-rank prince) under the title "Prince Lü of the First Rank". The peerage was passed down over eight generations and held by eight persons.

Members of the Prince Lü peerage

 Yuntao (允祹; 1686 – 1763) (1st), the Kangxi Emperor's 12th son, initially a beizi, promoted to second-rank prince in 1722, demoted to beizi in 1723, further demoted to grace defender duke in 1724, restored as a second-rank prince in 1730, promoted to first-rank prince as Prince Lü of the First Rank in 1735, posthumously honoured as Prince Lü Yi of the First Rank (履懿親王)
 (N/A)
 Yongcheng (永珹; 1739 – 1777) (2nd), the Qianlong Emperor's fourth son and Yuntao's adoptive grandson, held the title Prince Lü of the Second Rank from 1763 to 1777, posthumously honoured as Prince Lü Duan of the First Rank (履端親王) in 1799
 Mianhui (綿惠; 1764 – 1796) (3rd), Yongcheng's eldest son, held the title of a beile from 1777 to 1796, posthumously honoured as Prince Lü of the Second Rank
 Yilun (奕綸; 1790 – 1836) (4th), Mianqin's son and Mianhui's adoptive son (from line of Prince Cheng's peerage), held the title of a beizi from 1796 to 1809, promoted to beile in 1809, demoted to beizi in 1835, posthumously honoured as a beile in 1836
 Zaigang (載鋼; 1823 – 1882), Yilun's ninth son, held the title of a feng'en zhenguo gong from 1865 to 1882
 Pumao (溥楙; 1850–1882) (6th), Zaigang's third son and Zaifen's adoptive son, held the title of a grace bulwark duke from 1854 to 1882
 Yuchang (毓昌; 1878 – 1885) (7th), Pumao's eldest son, held the title of a grace defender duke from 1882 to 1885, had no male heir
 Zaifen (載鈖; 1825 – 1853) (5th), Yilun's tenth son, held the title of a beizi from 1836 to 1853, had no male heir
 Zaihe (載鶴; 1833 – 1884), Yilun's 12th son, held the title of a grace general from 1856 to 1884
 Puzhi (溥植; 1882 – 1936) (8th), Zaihe's eldest son, held the title of a grace defender duke from 1885 to 1936
 Yujun (毓鈞; b. 1902), Puzhi's son
 Hengpei (恆培; b. 1928), Yujun's son

Cadet line

Yuntao's cadet line
 Hongkun (弘昆; 1739 – 1750), Yuntao's fifth son, posthumously honoured as the hereditary prince of Prince Lü of the First Rank in 1750

Yilun's cadet line

 Zaiwu (載鋙), Yilun's sixth son, held the title of a first class bulwark general from 1838 to 1847
 Pusen (溥森), Zaiwu's eldest son, held the title of a supporter general from 1847 to 1881
 Yucun (毓存), Pusen's fourth son, held the title of a grace general in 1881, had no male heir
 Zaigang (載鋼; 1823 – 1882), Yilun's ninth son, held the title of a feng'en zhenguo gong from 1865 to 1882
 Zaihe (載鶴; 1833 – 1884), Yilun's 12th son, held the title of a grace general from 1856 to 1884
 Zai'ai (載藹), Yilun's 13th son, held the title of a grace general from 1856 to 1901
 Puquan (溥泉), Zai'ai's eldest son, held the title of a grace general from 1902

Family tree

See also
 Royal and noble ranks of the Qing dynasty

References
 

Qing dynasty princely peerages
Peerages of the Bordered White Banner